Saint Victor School is a Catholic elementary and junior high school operated by Saint Victor Parish in San Jose, California, United States. It serves families of the Diocese of San Jose, from kindergarten to eighth grade.

References 

Private elementary schools in California
Roman Catholic Diocese of San Jose in California
Education in Santa Clara County, California
Catholic elementary schools in California